Amorzidehabad (also Romanized as Āmorzīdehābād, Amr Zeydābād, Amorzeydābād, and Āmorzeydābād; also known as 'Āmarzābād, Āmorzābād, and Marzīdehābād) is a village in Qahab-e Shomali Rural District, in the Central District of Isfahan County, Isfahan Province, Iran. At the 2006 census, its population was 96, in 22 families.

References 

Populated places in Isfahan County